Aa erosa is a species of orchid in the genus Aa. It is endemic to Peru and blooms in late winter and early spring.

References

erosa
Plants described in 1912
Endemic flora of Peru